Little Big Girl is a 2002 Danish children's film directed by Morten Køhlert based on the book Hungerbarnet by Cecil Bødker.

References

External links 

Films based on children's books
Danish children's films
2000s Danish-language films
2000s children's films